In Humppa We Trust is a live album by the Finnish humppa band Eläkeläiset, released in 1996. All of the songs on the album are covers/remixes of famous songs.

Track listing
"Nitro" – 2:37       
"Humppaleka" – 2:26   [Elvis Presley 'Viva Las Vegas']    
"Humppapommi" – 2:23  [Rancid 'Time Bomb']     
"Humppaukaasi" – 3:58  [Queen 'We Will Rock You']     
"Perjantaina Humpassa" – 2:56 [The Cure 'Friday I'm in Love']      
"Tilulilulei" – 1:53       [The Kingsmen 'Louie Louie']
"Mitä Aimolle on Tapahtunut?" – 2:28  [The Offspring 'What Happened to You?']    
"Dumkopf" – 3:06       [Troggs 'Wild Thing']
"Humppaan Itsekseni" – 2:49     [Billy Idol 'Dancing With Myself']  
"Seinäkukkahumppa" – 3:03       [Oasis 'Wonderwall']
"Dementikon Keppihumppa" – 2:12       [Kiss 'I Was Made for Loving You']
"Panojenkka" – 2:54   [Los Del Rio 'Macarena']    
"Laakista Humppa" – 1:56       [Damned 'Love Song']
"Pottajenkka" – 3:38       [Joy Division 'Love Will Tear Us Apart']
"Humppa" – 3:02    [The Cranberries 'Zombie']   
"Pöpi" – 3:26       [22-Pistepirkko 'Birdy']
"Tarakkihumppa" – 3:58  [Disneyland After Dark 'Sleeping My Day Away']
"Heil Humppa" – 4:10       [Kim Wilde 'Kids in America']
"Humppaan Muna Tulessa" – 3:00       [The Doors 'Light My Fire']
"Humppaa Tai Kuole" – 2:44       [2 Unlimited 'No Limits']
"Soramonttuhumppa" – 3:19 [Metallica 'Enter Sandman']

External links
 [ Allmusic album entry]

1996 live albums
Eläkeläiset albums